Cork Harlequins Hockey and Cricket Club is a multi-sports club based in the Douglas area of Cork in Ireland. The club was founded in 1925. Although Harlequins is best known for its field hockey and cricket teams, during its history the club has also organised teams in various other sports including table tennis, association football, rugby union and tennis. In 2008–09 Cork Harlequins were founder members of both Men's Irish Hockey League and the Women's Irish Hockey League. As of 2018–19, the club's senior women's team continue to play in national league and the Women's Irish Senior Cup. The club's senior men's team have also played the Men's Irish Senior Cup and were All-Ireland club champions in 2002. Reserve teams play in the Men's Irish Junior Cup and the Women's Irish Junior Cup. Cork Harlequins have also represented Ireland in European competitions.

History

Women's field hockey
Cork Harlequins was founded in 1925, initially as a women's field hockey team. A group of women employed by Dowdall and O'Mahony, a dairy shop on St Patrick's Street, decided to enter a tournament at Church Road in Blackrock. The team captain chose their name after noticing the ball in their first match was made by Harlequins of London. Cork Harlequins women won the Irish Senior Cup for the first time in 2000. In 2008–09 Cork Harlequins were founder members of the Women's Irish Hockey League. In 2009–10 with a team that included Yvonne O'Byrne, Cliodhna Sargent, Rachael Kohler and Sinead McCarthy, Harlequins finished as league runners up. In 2016–17 with a team that included Yvonne O'Byrne, Roisin Upton and Naomi Carroll, Cork Harlequins were Irish Senior Cup finalists. In 2017–18 O'Byrne, Upton and Carroll helped Harlequins finish as runners up in both the national league 
and the EY Champions Trophy.

Women's Irish Hockey League

Irish Senior Cup

Irish Junior Cup

Notes

Men's field hockey
Cork Harlequins men's field hockey team were All-Ireland club champions in 2002. They won the Irish Senior Cup for the first time in 2006. Their squad included schoolboys, David and Conor Harte. Cork Harlequins subsequently went onto represent Ireland in the 2007 European Cup Winners Trophy. They won the trophy after defeating Kolos Sekoia of Ukraine 4–1 in a penalty shoot-out. In 2008–09 Cork Harlequins were founder members of the Men's Irish Hockey League.

Irish Senior Cup

 
Notes

Irish Junior Cup

Cricket
Cork Harlequins formed a cricket team in 1967. They enter senior, junior and minor teams in various Munster Cricket Union leagues.

Harlequin Park
The land for Harlequin Park was purchased at Farmers Cross in the early 1960s from Dick Young for £900. In September 1970 the Lord Mayor of Cork opened the new club pavilion which today houses the club bar. In the 1970s a new playing pitch was developed, which became the first "grit" playing surface in the Republic of Ireland. More land was purchased and car parking and the pavilion were extended to include two new dressing rooms, a function hall and a kitchen. The grit pitch was converted into a sand based astroturf surface in 1987, the second of its kind in the Republic. In the 1980s and 1990s more land was purchased from Murphy's Caravan Park and from the Rolf family to increase the size of the facility. A second astroturf pitch was constructed in 1998. The first astroturf pitch fell into disrepair and was used as a car park for a period of time. The club now has two functioning field hockey pitches as well as cricket facilities.

Notable players

Men's field hockey internationals

Women's field hockey internationals
 
When Ireland won the silver medal at the 2018 Women's Hockey World Cup, the squad included two Cork Harlequins players, Yvonne O'Byrne and Roisin Upton.

Honours
Men's field hockey
European Cup Winners Trophy
Winners: 2007: 1
All-Ireland Club Championship
Winners: 2002: 1
Irish Senior Cup
Winners: 2006, 2012: 2
Runners Up: 1938, 1950, 1991, 1995, 2003, 2004: 6 
Irish Junior Cup
Winners: 1999: 1
Runners Up: 1930, 1979, 1988, 1991, 1997, 2005, 2007: 7
Women's field hockey
European Cup Winners Cup B Division
Winners: 2001
Women's Irish Hockey League
Runners Up: 2009–10, 2017–18
EY Champions Trophy
Runners Up: 2018
Irish Senior Cup
Winners: 2000, 2018–19
Runners Up: 2003, 2017
Irish Junior Cup
Winners: 1990, 1992

References

External links
 Cork Harlequins on Facebook
  Cork Harlequins on Twitter

Women's Irish Hockey League teams
1925 establishments in Ireland
Field hockey clubs established in 1925
Harlequins
Cricket clubs in Munster
Cricket in County Cork
Cork